The 10th Iowa Infantry Regiment was an infantry regiment that served in the Union Army during the American Civil War.

Service
The 10th Iowa Infantry was organized at Iowa City, Iowa, and Montezuma, Iowa, and mustered into Federal service on September 6 (9 companies) and September 28, 1861 (remaining company). The regiment was mustered out on August 15, 1865, in Little Rock, Arkansas.

Total strength and casualties
Total enrollment was 1319.  The regiment lost 6 officers and 95 enlisted men who were killed in action or who died of their wounds and 134 enlisted men who died of disease, for a total of 235 fatalities.  277 were wounded.

Commanders
Colonel Nicholas Perczel
Colonel William E. Small

See also
List of Iowa Civil War units

References

Bibliography
Baker, Nathaniel B. (1863). The Report of The Adjutant General and Acting Quartermaster General of Iowa. Volume 1. F.W. Palmer. State Printer. Des Moines, Iowa.

External links
The Civil War Archive

Units and formations of the Union Army from Iowa
1861 establishments in Iowa
Military units and formations established in 1861
Military units and formations disestablished in 1865